Alfred Bohrmann (February 28, 1904 – January 4, 2000) was a German astronomer and discoverer of minor planets.

He did his Ph.D. dissertation in 1927 at the Heidelberg-Königstuhl State Observatory, at the University of Heidelberg. At the time, the observatory at Heidelberg was a center for asteroid discovery by Max Wolf and Karl Reinmuth and others, and during his time there Bohrmann discovered 9 asteroids. Bohrmann worked there from 1924 to 1969, publishing more than 700 minor planet observations. He left the observatory after a dispute with the higher authority.

The asteroid 1635 Bohrmann is named after him.

References

External links 
  Obituary

1904 births
2000 deaths
Discoverers of asteroids
 
20th-century German astronomers